Limnochromis staneri is a species of cichlid endemic to Lake Tanganyika where it occurs in the southern portion of the lake.  This species can reach a length of  TL. The specific name honours the Belgian colonial administrator P. Staner who provided translations for the Belgian Hydrobiological Mission to Lake Tanganyika (1946-1947), on which type was collected.

References

Fauna of Zambia
staneri
Taxa named by Max Poll
Fish described in 1949
Taxonomy articles created by Polbot